Willy DeVille Live is a live recording of Willy DeVille and the Mink DeVille Band. It was recorded on June 16–17, 1993 at The Bottom Line in Greenwich Village, New York City, and in October 1993, at the Olympia Theatre in Paris. It was released in Europe on December 1, 1993 in Europe by the French label Fnac Music (the album was not released in the United States).

Willy DeVille Live was dedicated to Steve Douglas, who played saxophone on the first three Mink DeVille albums and produced Le Chat Bleu. Douglas died shortly before the album came out.

Willy DeVille Live reached the number one sales chart position in Spain.

Track listing
Unless otherwise noted, all songs by Willy DeVille.
 “Lilly's Daddy's Cadillac“ -  4:32
 “This Must Be the Night“ - 3:11
 “Savoir Faire“ - 3:03
 "Cadillac Walk" (John Martin) – 5:57
 “Bamboo Road“ - 5:04
 “Mixed Up, Shook Up Girl“ - 5:54
 “Heart and Soul“ - 4:25
 “Can't Do Without It“ - 3:47
 “Maybe Tomorrow“ - 3:25
 “I Must Be Dreaming“ - 4:59
 “Heaven Stood Still“ - 3:21
 “Demasiado Corazon“ - 3:51
 “Spanish Stroll“ - 6:11
 “Stand by Me“ - (Ben E. King, Jerry Leiber, Mike Stoller) - 4:16
 “Hey Joe” – (Billy Roberts) - 5:04

Personnel

The Mink DeVille Band
 Willy DeVille – lead vocals, guitar, dobro
 Mario Cruz – saxophone, percussion
 Seth Farber – keyboards, accordion
 David J. Keyes – bass guitar, double bass, background vocals
 Boris Kinberg – percussion
 Freddy Koëlla – guitar, violin, mandolin
 Shawn Murray – drums

The Valentine Brothers
 Billy Valentine – background vocals
 Johnny "Briz" Valentine – background vocals

The Brass Attack Horns
 Louis Cortelezzi – saxophone
 Steve Madaio – trumpet
 Tom "Bones" Malone – trombone, baritone saxophone

Production
 Willy DeVille – producer
 Philippe Rault – producer, executive producer
 Barbara Moutenot – production assistant
 Philippe Poustis – production assistant, A&R, executive producer (Fnac Music)
 Jules Solo – production assistant
 Rik Pekkonen – mixing (Ocean Way Studio, Los Angeles)
 Ken Allardyce – assistant engineer (Ocean Way)
 Doug Sax – mastering (The Mastering Lab, Los Angeles)
 Claude Gassian – photographer
 Geneviève Gauckler – cover design
 Fred Matthews – photographer

Bottom Line concerts (Effanel Mobile Studio)
 John Harris – recording engineer
 Brian Kingman – assistant engineer

Olympia Theatre concerts (Le Voyageur)
 Steve Boyer – recording engineer
 René Weiss – assistant engineer

Additional recordings (Looking Glass Studio, New York)
 Steve Boyer – recording engineer
 Dante De Sole – assistant

References

1993 live albums
Albums recorded at the Bottom Line
Willy DeVille albums